Hezekiah ben Solomon  (Hebrew: חזקיה בן שלמה) was the son of Solomon ben David and thus was the eighth Karaite exilarch of the line of Anan ben David. He lived in Iraq during the eleventh century. He was the father of Hasdai ben Hezekiah.

Karaite rabbis
Karaite exilarchs
11th-century rabbis from the Seljuk Empire
Year of death unknown
Year of birth unknown
Jewish royalty